Ban Thap Chang Station ( is an Airport Rail Link station on Bangkok–Chonburi Motorway in Prawet District, Eastern Bangkok. This station is an interchange station for the SRT Eastern Line.

Station layout

Airport Rail Link (Bangkok) stations